Waterman is an unincorporated community in Kitsap County, in the U.S. state of Washington.

History
A post office called Waterman was established in 1904, and remained in operation until 1935. The community was named after Delos Waterman, a pioneer settler.

References

Unincorporated communities in Kitsap County, Washington
Unincorporated communities in Washington (state)